This national electoral calendar for 2018 lists the national/federal elections held in 2018 in all sovereign states and their dependent territories. By-elections are excluded, though national referendums are included.

January
7 January: Northern Cyprus, Parliament
12–13 January: Czech Republic, President (1st round)
26–27 January: Czech Republic, President (2nd round)
28 January: 
Cyprus, President (1st round)
Finland, President

February
4 February: 
Costa Rica, President (1st round) and Parliament
Cyprus, President (2nd round)
Ecuador, Referendum
11 February: Monaco, Parliament
23 February: Djibouti, Parliament
26 February: Sint Maarten, Legislature

March
4 March: 
El Salvador, Parliament
Italy, Chamber of Deputies and Senate
Switzerland, Referendums
7 March: Sierra Leone, President and Parliament (1st round)
11 March: 
Colombia, House of Representatives and Senate
Cuba, Parliament
13 March: Grenada, Parliament
18 March: Russia, President
21 March: 
Antigua and Barbuda, Parliament
Netherlands, Referendum
25 March: Turkmenistan, Assembly and People's Council
26–28 March: Egypt, President
31 March: Sierra Leone, President and Parliament (2nd round)

April
1 April: Costa Rica, President (2nd round)
8 April: Hungary, Parliament
11 April: Azerbaijan, President
15 April: 
Guatemala, Referendum
Montenegro, President
20 April: Bhutan, National Council
22 April: 
French Polynesia, Legislature (1st round)
Paraguay, President, Chamber of Deputies and Senate
24 April: Greenland, Legislature

May
6 May: 
French Polynesia, Legislature (2nd round)
Lebanon, Parliament
9 May: Malaysia, House of Representatives
12 May: 
East Timor, Parliament
Iraq, Parliament
13 May: Slovenia, Referendum
16 May: Jersey, Legislature
17 May: Burundi, Constitutional Referendum
20 May: Venezuela, President
24 May: Barbados, Parliament
25 May: Ireland, Constitutional Referendum
27 May: Colombia, President (1st round)

June
3 June: Slovenia, National Assembly
10 June: Switzerland, Referendums
14 June: Cook Islands, Legislature
17 June: Colombia, President (2nd round)
24 June: Turkey, President and Parliament

July
1 July: Mexico, President, Chamber of Deputies and Senate
25 July: Pakistan, National Assembly
29 July: 
Cambodia, Parliament
Mali, President (1st round)
30 July: 
Comoros, Constitutional Referendum
Zimbabwe, President, House of Assembly and Senate

August
12 August: Mali, President (2nd round)
26 August: Colombia, Referendum

September
1 September: Mauritania, Parliament (1st round)
2–3 September: Rwanda, Chamber of Deputies
9 September: Sweden, Parliament
15 September: 
Bhutan, National Assembly (1st round)
Mauritania, Parliament (2nd round)
21 September: Eswatini, House of Assembly
23 September: 
Maldives, President
Switzerland, Referendums
30 September: Republic of Macedonia, Referendum

October
5–6 October: Czech Republic, Senate (1st round)
6 October: 
Gabon, National Assembly (1st round)
Latvia, Parliament
6–7 October: Romania, Constitutional Referendum
7 October: 
Bosnia and Herzegovina, Presidency and House of Representatives
Brazil, President (1st round), Chamber of Deputies and Senate
Cameroon, President
São Tomé and Príncipe, Parliament
10 October: Guernsey, Referendum
12–13 October: Czech Republic, Senate (2nd round)
14 October: Luxembourg, Parliament
18 October: Bhutan, National Assembly (2nd round)
20 October: Afghanistan, House of the People
26 October: Ireland, President and Constitutional Referendum
27 October: 
Afghanistan, House of the People (Kandahar only)
Gabon, National Assembly (2nd round)
28 October: 
Brazil, President (2nd round)
Georgia, President (1st round)

November
4 November: New Caledonia, Independence Referendum
6 November: 
Antigua and Barbuda, Constitutional Referendum 
Grenada, Constitutional Referendum 
United States, House of Representatives and Senate
American Samoa, House of Representatives and Constitutional ReferendumGuam, Governor, Attorney General, Auditor, Consolidated Commission on Utilities, Education Board, Legislature, and Supreme Court and Superior Court retention electionsU.S. Virgin Islands, Governor (1st round), Board of Education, Board of Elections and Legislature7 November: Madagascar, President (1st round)
11 November: Donetsk People's Republic, Head and ParliamentLuhansk People's Republic, Head and Parliament13 November: Northern Mariana Islands, Governor, Attorney General, House of Representatives, Senate, and Supreme Court retention electionsUnited States,  House of Representatives (Northern Mariana Islands only)
14 November: Fiji, Parliament
20 November: U.S. Virgin Islands, Governor (2nd round)24 November: 
Bahrain, Council of Representatives (1st round)
Taiwan, Referendums
25 November: 
Liechtenstein, Referendum
Switzerland, Referendums
28 November: Georgia, President (2nd round)

December
1 December: Bahrain, Council of Representatives (2nd round)
9 December: 
Armenia, Parliament
Peru, Constitutional Referendum
19 December: Madagascar, President (2nd round)
20 December: Togo, Parliament
30 December: 
Bangladesh, Parliament
Democratic Republic of the Congo, President and National Assembly
Indirect elections
The following indirect elections of heads of state and the upper houses of bicameral legislatures took place through votes in elected lower houses, unicameral legislatures, or electoral colleges: 
5 January, 28 June, 4 and 25 July, 10, 11 and 13 August, 15 and 29 November, 5 and 19 December: Malaysia, Senate
16 January, 23 March and 21 June: India, Council of States
19 January: Trinidad and Tobago, President
7 February: Nepal, National Assembly
15 February: South Africa, President
18 February: Bangladesh, President
25 February: Cambodia, Senate
2 March: Armenia, President
3 March: Pakistan, Senate
5 March to 20 March: China, President and Premier
12 March: Isle of Man, Legislative Council''
13 March: Nepal, President
22 and 28 March, 12 April and 13 June: Austria, Federal Council
24 March: Ivory Coast, Senate
25 March: Cameroon, 
28 March: Myanmar, President
1 April: San Marino, Captains Regent
19 April: Cuba, President
31 August: Fiji, President
4 September: Pakistan, President
1 October: 
Dominica, President
San Marino, Captains Regent
2 October: Iraq, President
23 October: Vietnam, President
25 October: Ethiopia, President
29 December: Algeria, Council of the Nation

See also
2018 in politics and government

References

National
National
Political timelines of the 2010s by year
National